Bermoik Monastery is a Buddhist monastery in Sikkim, northeastern India.

History 
The monastery was constructed in 1952.

See also 
Buddhism
Gautama Buddha
History of Buddhism in India
Buddhist pilgrimage sites in India

References

External links 

1952 establishments in Sikkim
Buddhist monasteries in Sikkim
Tibetan Buddhist monasteries and temples in India
Nyingma monasteries and temples